Norbert Tóth (born September 4, 1986) is a Hungarian basketball player for Falco KC Szombathely and the Hungarian national team.

He participated at the EuroBasket 2017.

References

1986 births
Living people
Forwards (basketball)
PVSK Panthers players
Hungarian men's basketball players
Basketball players from Budapest
Falco KC Szombathely players
BC Körmend players
Alba Fehérvár players